Gippi is an Indian Hindi-language teen drama film written and directed by Sonam Nair and produced by Hiroo Yash Johar and Karan Johar under the Dharma Productions banner, with UTV Motion Pictures serving as distributor. The film stars newcomer Riya Vij and Taaha Shah in lead roles. It released on 10 May 2013.

Cast 
 Riya Vij as Gurpreet "Gippi" Kaur
 Jayati Modi as Shamira
 Taaha Shah as Arjun
 Avanti Talwar as Tania
 Anah Talwar as Sonia
 Divya Dutta as Pardeep "Pappi" Kaur
 Raqesh Vashisth as Chemistry teacher
 Pankaj Dheer as Papa Paaji
 Mrinal Chawla as Kabir                                               
 Doorva Tripathi as Anchal
 Aditya Deshpande as Ashish Saraswat

Soundtrack 

The music was composed by Vishal–Shekhar, with lyrics by Anvita Dutt Guptan & Vishal Dadlani. the music label is on Sony Music.

Critical reception 
The film received mixed reviews from the critics.

Kshamaya Daniel for Rediff.com has given 4/5 stars and says Gippi is a movie meant for teens. And it has all the necessary teen masala—romance, a makeover, cheesy humour and loud music.
Taran Adarsh of Bollywood Hungama gave the movie a rating of 3.5/5 stars and said "On the whole, GIPPI is a credible take on the 'coming-of-age' variety of movies. This one's straight from the heart. Sweet, simple, emotionally engaging, heart-warming cinema!" Madhureeta Mukherjee of the Times of India gave the movie 3/5 stars mentioning " Sonam Nair's 'coming of puberty' film handles simple issues sensitively, though it doesn't delve too deep. The subtlety appeals, but lacks drama in the second half, with a mediocre climax." in.com also gave the film a favourable review saying it would "take adults down memory lane while connecting with teenagers at the same time." Rajeev Masand from CNN-IBN gave the movie 2/5 stars saying that "Ultimately, this could have been a sweet, unusual tale about the triumph of a nerd, yet it's let down by its affected tone."

References

External links 
 

2010s Hindi-language films
2013 films
Indian children's films
Indian teen drama films
Films scored by Vishal–Shekhar
UTV Motion Pictures films